Stephen Soter Ortynsky Hentosh, O.S.B.M. (29 January 1866 – 24 March 1916) was the first Bishop of all Greek Catholics in the United States.

Life

January 1, 1889, he made his vows with the Basilian Order.

July 18, 1891, he was ordained a priest by Metropolitan of Lviv Sylvester Sembratovych and celebrated his first Liturgy at the Monastery Church in Dobromyl.

March 26, 1907, Pope Pius X appointed him bishop for the Greek Catholics in America and named him titular Bishop of Daulia.  

May 12, 1907, he was consecrated Bishop by Metropolitan Andrey Sheptytsky, Bishop Konstantyn Chekhovych and Bishop Hryhory Khomyshyn in St. George's Cathedral, Lviv.

May 28, 1913, the Apostolic See named Bishop Ortynsky as exarch, granting him full ordinary jurisdiction, making him independent of every Latin diocese. On August 17, 1914, the Congregation de propaganda fide put out a decree about the governance of the Greek Catholic Church for the next ten years, called “Cum Episcopo”. It had four main points:
1) The bishop is subject only to the apostolic see and his seat is to be New York City while the vicar general and rector of the seminary should be in Philadelphia;
2) That they establish a seminary;
3) That the faithful should belong to their own church; and
4) Deals with mixed marriages and states that youth should be baptized in the rite of the father.

Bishop Ortynsky contracted pneumonia and died in Philadelphia on March 24, 1916.  An estimated 10-15 thousand people attended the funeral. The celebrant was the Vicar General of the Eparchy, Very Rev. Aleksander Dzubay.

Mission

His short tenure as Bishop was noted by his work setting up orphanages and a cathedral in Philadelphia, but unfortunately also for schism with the priests and parishes under his authority.  The exact reasons for the disagreements with the bishop are unclear. Initially they might have arisen from Bishop Ortynsky being under the authority of the Archbishop of Philadelphia as per the order of Pope Pius X.  Also, that Bishop Ortynsky was Ruthenian and Ruthenians were subject people of the Hungarians within the Austro-Hungarian Empire and that Hungarian priests may have thought that they should not be under a Ruthenian.  Bishop Ortynsky himself also noted that members of Russian Orthodox Church were fomenting trouble. 

“Bishop Ortynski complains, however, that his work is interfered with by members of the schimastic Russian Church, whose representatives at times attend the religious services of the Ruthenians and create disturbances.  The motives of the schismatics, the Bishop says are not religious, but political.  They owe, first of all, allegiance to the Czar, and hence try to increase Russian influence by winning over the various Slav nationalities to the State Church.”

The World War II Liberty Ship  was named in his honor.

Notes

External links
The First Greek Catholic Bishop in the United States:  Soter Ortynsky
Diocese of Stamford, Connecticut
Archdiocese of Philadelphia, Pennsylvania
Walter Paska. Sources of Particular Law for the Ukrainian Catholic Church in the United States (Washington, DC, 1975), at 33 and 52.

1916 deaths
1866 births
People from Lviv Oblast
People from the Kingdom of Galicia and Lodomeria
Ukrainian Austro-Hungarians
Ukrainian nobility
Bishops of the Ukrainian Greek Catholic Church
Eastern Catholic bishops in the United States
Bishops in Pennsylvania
20th-century Eastern Catholic bishops
Order of Saint Basil the Great